Daleyville may refer to:

 Daleyville, Ohio, United States
 Daleyville, Wisconsin, United States

See also
 Daley (disambiguation)